In enzymology, a deacetoxycephalosporin-C synthase is an enzyme that catalyzes the chemical reaction

penicillin N + 2-oxoglutarate + O2  deacetoxycephalosporin C + succinate + CO2 + H2O

The 3 substrates of this enzyme are penicillin N, 2-oxoglutarate, and O2, whereas its 4 products are deacetoxycephalosporin C, succinate, CO2, and H2O.

Classification 

This enzyme belongs to the family of oxidoreductases, specifically those acting on paired donors, with O2 as oxidant and incorporation or reduction of oxygen. The oxygen incorporated need not be derived from O2 with 2-oxoglutarate as one donor, and the other dehydrogenated.

Nomenclature 

The systematic name of this enzyme class is penicillin-N,2-oxoglutarate:oxygen oxidoreductase (ring-expanding). Other names in common use include DAOCS, penicillin N expandase, and DAOC synthase.

Biological role 

This enzyme participates in penicillin and cephalosporin biosynthesis.

Structural studies

References

 
 
 
 
 

EC 1.14.20
Enzymes of known structure